Each winner of the 1963 Governor General's Awards for Literary Merit was selected by a panel of judges administered by the Canada Council for the Arts.

Winners

English Language
Fiction: Hugh Garner, Hugh Garner's Best Stories.
Non fiction: J.M.S. Careless, Brown of the Globe.

French Language
Poetry or Drama: Gatien Lapointe, Ode au Saint-Laurent.
Non-Fiction: Gustave Lanctot, Histoire du Canada.

References 

Governor General's Awards
Governor General's Awards
Governor General's Awards